The 1985 Gulf Club Champions Cup, is an annually organized football league tournament for club of the Arabian Peninsula. It was the 3rd edition.  Al-Ahli won the title for the first time in their history.

Group stage

Group A

Group B

Final

Winner

References

 
 

GCC Champions League
Gulf Club Champions Cup, 1985